Elections to the Kingstown Urban District Council took place on Thursday 15 January 1914 as part of that year's Irish local elections. The election resulted in a shock defeat for the Unionists, who prior to the election had majority control of the council.

Kingstown was composed of four multi-member wards, with councillors being elected through Plurality-at-large voting.

Results by party

Ward Results

Monkstown

West

East

Glasthule

References

1914 Irish local elections
1914